The Cry of the Halidon is a 1974 suspense novel by Robert Ludlum.

Plot summary 
The story concerns a geologist, Alex McAuliff, who served in the Army as an infantry officer and fought in Korea, is commissioned to undertake a survey in Jamaica. It's an offer McAuliff just can't refuse: two million dollars for a geological survey of Jamaica's dark interior. All Dunstone, Limited asks for in return is his time, his expertise, and above all his absolute secrecy. No one is to know of Dunstone's involvement - not even McAuliff's handpicked team.

But British Intelligence knows and they've let Alex know a secret of their own: the last survey team sent to Jamaica by Dunstone vanished without a trace. For McAuliff, it's too late to turn back. Alex already knows about Dunstone...which means he already knows too much.

He is a marked man...but by whom? Dunstone Limited? British Intelligence? A rival company? A beautiful island and a beautiful woman who could be a spy are central to Alex's chance for survival. That and a single word...Halidon.

In common with other Ludlum novels the lead character discovers there is more to the deal than expected and McAuliff is enlisted by British Intelligence. The story develops as McAuliff's resources and abilities are tested eventually leading him to a secret organisation hidden in the Jamaican mountains.

Notes

1974 American novels
Novels by Robert Ludlum
Novels set in Jamaica